Midwest City High School is one of two high schools in Midwest City, Oklahoma, United States. The school is part of the Mid-Del School District, and serves more than 1,600 students.

History

Extracurricular activities

Band
The Midwest City High School Band (also known as the Pride of Midwest City) is a 120-135 member band under the direction of Head Band Director John Davis and Assistant Band Director Mark Hensley. The marching band consists of three drum majors, a complete percussion sideline ensemble, a full field band, and a full drumline.

In 2012, a new band room was added on to help hold two separate bands and ensembles during different time periods, and to help with the number of students in the program. During this period, the band received what is now the current band uniforms, along with more funding towards the band program itself.

After the football season is over, the band switches from marching season into what is known as "Concert Season."

Each year, the band becomes divided into two bands: the Symphonic Band and the Wind Ensemble. Each competes in the OSSAA state concert band contest held in April of each year. Both bands also perform in the Winter (Christmas) Concert in December, and in the Spring Concert in May of each year.

The students in band at the feeder schools Monroney Middle School and Jarmen Middle School, along with some transfer students from different schools and districts, helped make the school's band program over the years, especially when Mid-Del made Jr. High schools into Middle Schools and moved ninth grade to high school, adding on to the number of students in the band program starting in 2007.

This program also contains two jazz ensembles, "The Beginning Jazz Band," and the more collegiate "The Advance Jazz Band," both under the direction of Mark Hensley, who has directed the Ensembles since he began working at Midwest City High School in 2002.

Athletics

Baseball
 Spring Ball State Champs -  5A 1988

Basketball
Girls' 5A State Champs - 1992
Girls' 6A State Champs - 2010, 2016
Boys'  6A State Champs - 1998, 2000, 2001, 2007

Wrestling
 National Champions - 1981, 1990, 1991
 Team State Championships - 1971, 1972, 1974, 1976, 1979, 1980,  1981, 1983, 1984, 1986, 1987, 1990, 1991, 1995, 2007, 2008
 Dual State Championships - 1990, 1991, 1995, 2001, 2006

The Bomber wrestling program consists of over 90 individual state champions and an impressive 59 Oklahoma High School wrestling All-State athletes.

Track and field
 Boys' Team State Champs
 2A 1965
 5A 1998
 6A 2006, 2007
 Girls' Team State Champs
 6A 1999, 2000, 2008

Football
 State Championships 1890, 1985, 1988, 1994, 1995, 1996
'Swimming

Air Force JROTC

Midwest City High School's Air Force JROTC unit started in 1993, with the unit number OK931. The honor guard (normally known as color guard; however, the name was taken by the flag girls) present the colors at most of the football and basketball games, along with other events, such as a New Orleans Hornets game during their relocation to Oklahoma City.

The current SASI is retired Lt. Col. Mike Penning, who replaced retired Col. Cross. The current ASI is retired Master Sergeant Alex Means.

DECA

Notable alumni

 Ryan Budde, professional baseball player, Circuit
 Kelly Cook, professional football player
 Ted Cox, Major League Baseball player, Boston Red Sox
 Cale Gundy, running backs' football coach, University of Oklahoma
 Mike Gundy, head football coach, Oklahoma State University
 A. J. Hinch, professional baseball player; manager of the Houston Astros
 Darnell Jackson, NBA player, Cleveland Cavaliers
 Matt Kemp, professional baseball player, San Diego Padres
 Bill Krisher, Pittsburgh Steelers
 Aaron McConnell, football player
 Tony Palmer, National Football Association, Green Bay Packers
 Shelden Williams, NBA player

References

External links
Official website
 Oklahoma Secondary Schools Activities Association

Public high schools in Oklahoma
Schools in Oklahoma County, Oklahoma
Midwest City, Oklahoma